Picture Rocks is a census-designated place (CDP) in Pima County, Arizona, United States, home of the Tucson artifacts. The population was 8,139 at the 2000 census.

Geography
Picture Rocks is located at  (32.330735, -111.229652).

Demographics

At the 2000 census there were 8,139 people and 2,883 households residing in the CDP. The racial makeup of the CDP was 89.6% White, 0.6% Black or African American, 1.4% Native American, 0.4% Asian, 0.1% Pacific Islander, 5.4% from other races, and 2.6% from two or more races.  13.8% of the population were Hispanic or Latino of any race.
Of the 2,883 households 38.6% had children under the age of 18 living with them, 59.2% were married couples living together, 10.6% had a female householder with no husband present, and 24.3% were non-families. 18.4% of households were one person and 4.2% were one person aged 65 or older.  The average household size was 2.82 and the average family size was 3.20.

The age distribution was 30.0% under the age of 18, 6.3% from 18 to 24, 31.3% from 25 to 44, 24.5% from 45 to 64, and 7.9% 65 or older.  The median age was 36 years. For every 100 females, there were 102.6 males.  For every 100 females age 18 and over, there were 99.8 males.

The median household income was $39,534 and the median family income  was $43,026. Males had a median income of $30,752 versus $21,513 for females. The per capita income for the CDP was $17,132.  About 4.3% of families and 7.5% of the population were below the poverty line, including 10.9% of those under age 18 and 1.8% of those age 65 or over.

References

External links

Census-designated places in Pima County, Arizona
Populated places in the Sonoran Desert